The Governor of Saratov Oblast is the head of government of Saratov Oblast, a federal subject of Russia.

The position was introduced in 1991 as Head of Administration. The title of office was changed to Governor after Dmitry Ayatskov won the 1996 election.

List of officeholders

References 

Politics of Saratov Oblast
 
Saratov